Cross Creek Programs was a reform school facility in La Verkin, Utah, operated by the World Wide Association of Specialty Programs and Schools (WWASPS). It sometimes is referred to as two facilities, with the name Cross Creek Manor applied to the girls' program and the name Cross Creek Center used for the boys' program, which were originally in different locations. Cross Creek Academy and Browning Academy have been used as names for the academic program. Cross Creek Programs was founded in 1988 by Robert Lichfield and Brent Facer, originally only for girls. Before founding Cross Creek, Lichfield had worked at Provo Canyon School.

The school ("Cross Creek Academy") was educationally accredited through the Northwest Accreditation Commission.

In an interview, multiple graduates, parents and staff members from the school described the program as manipulative, abusive and traumatic. 

One graduate claimed he was forcibly kidnapped from his home, handcuffed, beaten, and taken across state lines against his will in order to be transported to the program, or in short legally trafficked. 

Another graduate claimed to be supervised by a male staff member when she was showering at the age of 13. 

Another graduate claimed that male staff members performed rape re-enactment on girls who have been sexually abused, stating that other students were instructed to yell insults at the victim during the re-enactment. 

Executives from the school have denied these allegations, saying the accusers just "didn't like their parents trying to help them".

In 2006, a lawsuit was filed against Cross Creek and other defendants, alleging widespread physical and psychological abuse of the teenagers sent into their programs.

References

External links

 Information

Boarding schools in Utah
Youth rights in the United States
Therapeutic boarding schools in the United States
Schools in Washington County, Utah
Private middle schools in Utah
Private high schools in Utah
World Wide Association of Specialty Programs and Schools